Julian Drive are an American contemporary Christian music and Christian alternative rock band from Athens, Georgia, and they were formed in 2002. Their members are Shane Bowers, Tyler Ivory, & David Sosebee. Their debut album came on the heals of winning the 2004 Exalting Him Talent competition and they released singles, "Famous" and "Any Way the Wind Blows" with Daywind Records. Their follow up,My Coming Day, came with Inpop Records, in 2009. This saw the single album breakthrough on the Billboard magazine charts, and the song, "The Reason", place on the Christian Songs chart. Their single, "From Your Hands" also received favorable reviews.

Background
The contemporary Christian music and Christian alternative rock band formed in Athens, Georgia, in 2002. They count as their members; lead vocalist and guitarist, Shane Bowers, drums/guitars, Tyler Ivory, bassist, David Sosebee.

Music history
The group formed in 2002, with their first major label release studio album, My Coming Day, was released by Inpop Records on January 27, 2009. This album was a Billboard magazine breakthrough release upon the Christian Albums chart at No. 31, while it placed at 38 on the Heatseekers Albums chart. The song, "The Reason", peaked at No. 46 on the Christian Songs chart.

Past & Current Members
Current members
 Shane Bowers – vocals, guitar
 Shaun Bennett – keyboard
 James Nitz – bass
 Jesse Triplett – guitar
 Brian Wilson – drums
 Josh Seagraves - drums
 Tyler Ivory - drums
 David Sosebee - bass

Discography
Studio albums

References

External links
 Official website

Musical groups established in 2004
Musical groups from Georgia (U.S. state)
Inpop Records artists